Tish Finley Cyrus (born May 15, 1967) is an American manager and producer. She has managed her daughter, Miley Cyrus, since the beginning of her career, and still manages her along with Jonathan Daniel from Crush Music. Tish is president of Hopetown Entertainment, a TV and film production company.

Career 
Cyrus has produced films starring her daughter Miley Cyrus. She was the executive producer of The Last Song, based on the novel by Nicholas Sparks. She starred in the TV show Cyrus vs. Cyrus: Design and Conquer, which launched on May 25, 2017.

Personal life 
Cyrus had two children, Brandi and Trace, before marrying Billy Ray Cyrus. Both were adopted by Billy Ray after their marriage.

In 1992, Tish gave birth to her third child, Miley Cyrus (born Destiny Hope Cyrus), with Billy Ray Cyrus. On December 28, 1993, Billy Ray and Tish wed. She had her fourth child, Braison Chance Cyrus, in 1994. In 2000, she gave birth to her fifth child, Noah Lindsey Cyrus.

The family lived on a  farm in Thompson's Station, outside of Nashville, Tennessee, before moving to Los Angeles for the filming of Hannah Montana.

On October 26, 2010, Billy Ray Cyrus filed for divorce from Tish in Tennessee, citing irreconcilable differences. In a statement made to People the next day announcing the split, Billy and Tish said, "As you can imagine, this is a very difficult time for our family... We are trying to work through some personal matters. We appreciate your thoughts and prayers."
However, on March 18, 2011, Billy Ray announced on The View that he had dropped the divorce.
On June 13, 2013, Tish filed for divorce from Billy Ray after 19 years of marriage, citing irreconcilable differences. However, it was reported in July 2013 that they had gone to couples therapy and rekindled their relationship. In April 2022, Tish Cyrus filed for divorce a second time, with the divorce papers revealing that the couple had been separated for more than two years.
In November 2022, Cyrus confirmed her relationship with Prison Break star Dominic Purcell.

Cannabis advocacy 
Cyrus reintroduced her daughter, Miley, to cannabis after quitting upon the release of the album Younger Now. During an interview with Andy Cohen, Miley stated that her mother joked about quitting as her manager in order to start a cannabis company.

Filmography

References

External links 

Actresses from Nashville, Tennessee
1967 births
Tish
Film producers from Tennessee
Living people
American women film producers
Place of birth missing (living people)
21st-century American women